Pat Carroll (11 February 1956 – 16 March 1986) was an Irish sportsperson. He played hurling with his local club Coolderry and with the Offaly senior inter-county team from 1977 until 1985.

Early & private life

Pat Carroll was born in Newhall, County Offaly in 1956.  He was born into a family that had a strong association with hurling. His father was the goalkeeper on the Offaly and Leinster teams while his granduncles, Jim and Joe, played with the county and won two junior All-Ireland titles in 1923 and 1929. While his grandfather Red Jack Teehan was the first Offaly man to hurl for Leinster. Carroll grew up on the family farm and was educated at Coolderry national school and the Presentation College in Birr. After finishing school he farmed his fathers dairy farm.

Playing career

Club

Carroll played his club hurling with his local Coolderry club. He enjoyed much success and won two senior county titles in 1977 and 1980, captaining the side in 1980 and winning the man of the match award.

Inter-county

Carroll first came to prominence on the inter-county scene as a member of the Offaly minor hurling team in 1973. He also played at this level in 1974 before later joining the county under-21 team. Carroll spent four years playing with the under-21 team, however, he had little success in this level either. He made his senior debut in a National Hurling League game against Antrim in 1975. It would be 1977 before Carroll made his debut in the championship.

Three years later in 1980 Carroll won his first Leinster title.  It was also the first time that Offaly had won the provincial title. Unfortunately, the county's success came to an end in the All-Ireland semi-final with Galway. The following year Carroll won his second Leinster title, a win which allowed Offaly advance directly into the All-Ireland final. Galway provided the opposition in the championship decider and were the favourites, however, Carroll scored a vital in the first half to keep Offaly in the match.  The 'Faithful County' went on to win the game with Carroll collecting his first All-Ireland medal. He was later the recipient of an All-Star award.

Carroll captained Offaly in 1982 and 1983, however, Offaly were defeated in the Leinster final by Kilkenny. In 1984 he won a third Leinster medal before giving an exceptional display in the All-Ireland semi-final against Galway. Cork provided the opposition in the subsequent centenary year All-Ireland final at Semple Stadium. Unfortunately for Carroll, 'the Rebels' ended up as the victors. The following year Carroll won his fourth Leinster medal in spite of being quite ill. He played his last game for Offaly in the All-Ireland semi-final against Antrim that year, however, he later won an All-Ireland medal as a substitute as Offaly defeated Galway in the championship decider. Carroll also lined out with Leinster in the Railway Cup inter-provincial competition. He won a Railway Cup medal in 1979.

Pat Carroll died after a short illness on 16 March 1986.

Teams

External links
 Profile of Pat Carroll

1956 births
1986 deaths
Coolderry hurlers
Offaly inter-county hurlers
Leinster inter-provincial hurlers
All-Ireland Senior Hurling Championship winners